Zhenjiang West railway station was a railway station located in Runzhou District, Zhenjiang, Jiangsu on the Beijing–Shanghai railway that handled passenger and freight traffic. In 1978, the new Zhenjiang Railway Station was opened due to the Beijing-Shanghai Railway moving south. In 2003, because the station affected traffic, it was demolished. In 2010, Zhongshan Square was built where the railway station once stood, to commemorate Sun-Yat sen who got off twice at Zhenjiang West station to inspect Zhenjiang.

History
Opened with the Shanghai–Nanjing railway in 1906.

This station was situated on a less direct route further north of the existing railway line. This line was lifted in 2004.

See also 

 Zhenjiang railway station
 Zhenjiang East railway station

References

Railway stations closed in 2003
Coordinates on Wikidata
Railway stations in Zhenjiang
Runzhou District
Railway stations in China opened in 1906